The 1952 Currie Cup was the 24th edition of the Currie Cup, the premier domestic rugby union competition in South Africa.

See also

 Currie Cup

References

1952
1952 in South African rugby union
Currie